Seven Sisters Falls is a community in the Rural Municipality of Whitemouth, Manitoba.

It is the location of Manitoba Hydro's Seven Sisters Generating Station and the Whitemouth Falls Provincial Park. Seven Sisters Falls was named by fur traders for a series of seven rapids that were located along the Winnipeg River which are now the site of the hydroelectric dam.

References

Unincorporated communities in Eastman Region, Manitoba